Kosal Dev Singh was the grandson of Anangpal Tomar, the son of (उष्ण सिंह)Ausan Singh/Kesri Singh who was king of Patan, Alwar. According to the Haryana State Gazetteer, Singh founded Kosli, a large village in 1193 A.D. He was said to have met sage Baba Mukteshwar Puri, Kosli, who was engaged in meditation under dense shrub jungle.

References

History of Delhi
12th-century Indian monarchs